Nachtvlinder   is a 1999 Dutch family film directed by Herman van Veen. It was van Veen's second feature film, after 1979's Uit Elkaar. The film, done on a small budget, struggled with negative reviews.

Cast
Arthur Kristel	... 	Prins Ruben
Babette van Veen	... 	Sarah Mogèn
Ramses Shaffy	... 	Walko van Haland
Hans Trentelman	... 	Onorg
Fred Delfgaauw	... 	Koning Olaf van Haland
Maike Meijer	... 	Jonkvrouw Hinde Baldon
Jules Croiset	... 	Abraham Mogèn
Karin Bloemen	... 	Geertrui Moens
Herman van Veen	... 	Wogram
Frits Lambrechts	... 	Stuurman
Niels Reijnders	... 	Martijn
Sarah de Wit	... 	Alma Mogèn
Lori Spee	... 	Moeder Mogèn

External links 
 

Dutch children's films
1999 films
1990s Dutch-language films